Chomphu may refer to:

 Chomphu, Lampang
 Chomphu, Phitsanulok